SS Corinthic was a British passenger ship, built in 1902 by Harland & Wolff and launched for the British shipping companies White Star Line and Shaw, Savill & Albion Line. She was the second of the s built for passenger and cargo service between Britain and New Zealand. In 1931 Corinthic was decommissioned and scrapped.

References
 Ship Description from The Ships List

 

1902 ships
Ships built in Belfast
Ships of the White Star Line
Steamships of the United Kingdom
Ships built by Harland and Wolff